Athienou ( or) is a village in Larnaca District, Cyprus. It is one of only four villages located within the United Nations Buffer Zone, the other three being Pyla, Troulloi and Deneia. Today, Athienou has a population of around 6,500 people. Since 1990, it has been home to Davidson College's Athienou Archaeological Project. The town's city hall includes a museum of local history and culture that was established in 2008.

Toponymy
It is considered by many, that the name of the village Athienou, derived from the ancient Greek word, "Atta" (Greek: Αττα) or "Atha" (Greek: Αθθα), meaning large rock, which characterized the rocky land of the village.
According to another theory, the name derives from a Lusignan called Étienne, who lived in the area, and the people who lived in the village were mentioning his house as "Etienne's Place" (Greek: "Στου Ετιένου", stou etiennou), and in later years that changed into Athienou.

History
It has been a settlement since Middle Bronze Age.

References

External links
 
 Athienou Archaeological Project 
 Athienou municipality

Municipalities in Larnaca District